Hatred is a human emotion.

Hatred may also refer to:

 Mollenard, also known as Hatred, a 1938 French drama film
 Hatred (1977 film), a Soviet film
 Hatred (2012 film), an Iranian drama film
 Hatred (video game), a 2015 video game
 "Hatred", a song by Baboon from their album Sausage

See also  
 Hate (disambiguation)